Music and Audio Institute of New Zealand (MAINZ) is a faculty of the Southern Institute of Technology, focused on contemporary music and music-industry related education. MAINZ offers music and audio courses from Certificates to Graduate Diplomas at campuses in Auckland and Christchurch. MAINZ alumni include Joel Little, Josh Fountain, Troy Kingi, Karen Hunter, Gin Wigmore, Zowie, members of the Checks, Concord Dawn, Goldenhorse, Goodnight Nurse, Midnight Youth, the Mint Chicks, The Naked and Famous and 8 Foot Sativa. MAINZ tutors have included New Zealand music luminaries Harry Lyon and Dave McCartney.

History

Established in Greymouth
Tai Poutini Polytechnic in Greymouth first offered a Certificate in Contemporary Music programme when the institute was established in 1990. In 1992 the Certificate in Audio Engineering and Music Production was introduced, and a purpose-built sound and recording studio was constructed at the Greymouth campus. This programme was followed by a Certificate in Live Sound and Event Production which commenced in 1994.That same year (1994) a Certificate in Audio Engineering was offered in Auckland and temporary premises were leased in Queen Street.The Diploma of Audio Engineering and Music Production was added at the Auckland Campus at 11-13 Waverley street in 1995, using York Street Studio 'A' in Parnell for studio practicals. In 1996 Certificates in Contemporary Music and Live Sound and Event Production were offered in Auckland, originally using Waverley Street for theory and what is now the Basement Theatre.co.nz/store Basement Theatre for practicals. From 1996 the Certificate and Diploma in Audio Engineering and Music Production ran on the seventh floor of the LJ Hooker building (formerly AETNA house) on Symonds Street, Auckland,.

Live Sound ( Special Event) and Contemporary Music programmes moved to the Manukau Institute of Technology Campus in 1997.

For a number of years the Certificate in Audio Engineering and Certificate in Contemporary Music were offered at Auckland and Greymouth campuses simultaneously.

Established in Christchurch and Auckland 
In 1998, the entire suite of Music and Audio programmes was relocated to Auckland.  

In 2001 all the teaching was consolidated on the former premises, Rainger House, at 150 Victoria Street West, Auckland. The new Auckland campus was opened by Prime Minister Helen Clark. During 2001, audio engineering programmes were offered for the first time in Christchurch.

A suitable building at 191 High Street in the Christchurch CBD was leased and outfitted ready for  the start  of 2002. Initially  the Certificate in Audio  Engineering Level 5 was offered, and the Diploma of Audio Engineering Level 6 was added in 2003. The MAINZ Certificate in Live Sound and Event Production Level 4 was offered from 2004.

After experiencing high demand for its DJ short courses, MAINZ began offering a Level 4 Certificate in DJ and Electronic Music Production programme from its Auckland campus in 2010. The 1-year full-time programme was led by award-winning Detroit DJ and producer Recloose and offered training in electronic music production, performance and DJing techniques. Cert DJEMP's success in Auckland led to the programme being offered from MAINZ's Christchurch campus beginning in February 2014.  Since 2014, delivery of DJEMP at the MAINZ Auckland campus has been led by DJ, producer and Ableton Live Certified trainer Chris Cox aka Frank Booker. A level 5 Diploma was introduced in 2018.

Since 2020, MAINZ Auckland has been found at 15 Canning Crescent, Māngere.

Established Degree Level Provision 
With interest for degree level provision developing MAINZ started offering the CPIT Bachelor of Musical Arts in 2014. In 2015 Tai Poutini Polytechnic gained approval to offer their own Bachelor of Musical Arts and the first graduates were awarded their degrees in the March 2017 graduation.

The Graduate Diploma in Business and Enterprise was also introduced in 2015.

MAINZ offered a Bachelor of Audio Engineering and Production and a new Graduate Diploma in Audio Engineering and Production in 2016 and had its first graduates receiving their degree in the ceremony of 2017.

As of 2021, MAINZ is able to offer the following qualifications:
 Graduate Diploma in Music Production
 Bachelor of Musical Arts
 New Zealand Diploma in Music (Level 5)
 New Zealand Diploma in Audio Engineering and Production (Level 5)
 New Zealand Certificate in DJ and Electronic Music Production (Level 4)
 New Zealand Certificate in Entertainment and Event Technology (Level 4) with strands in Lighting and Live Sound
 New Zealand Certificate in Music (Level 4)
 New Zealand Certificate in Foundation Skills (Level 1)
 New Zealand Certificate in Foundation Skills (Level 2)

Transfer to Southern Institute of Technology 

On 31 January 2018 the MAINZ faculty transferred from Tai Poutini Polytechnic to Southern Institute of Technology.

MAINZ moved to 15 Canning Crescent, Māngere, where MAINZ is currently housed within the Te Wānanga o Aotearoa building. Like TWOA, MAINZ is awaiting its place within a new structure of the super polytechnic, Te Pūkenga (an entity that will enjoy unique privileges within NZ tertiary education).

Awards 
Alumni from MAINZ have won over 60 music awards, including Grammy Awards , VNZMA's and APRA Silver Scrolls.

Sources: APRA AMCOS Awards NZ Music Awards Grammy Awards

References

External links 

 Official website
 Southern Institute of Technology

Music schools in New Zealand